Mathias Hansen may refer to:

 Mathias Hansen House, a former Renaissance-style townhouse located in central Copenhagen, Denmark
 Mathias Bau Hansen (born 1993) is a Danish ice hockey player
 Mathias Lykke Hansen (born 1984),  Danish professional football player
 Mathias Lee Hansen (born 1987), Danish gymnast